Metropolitano Stadium (Spanish: Estadio Metropolitano), also referred to as Cívitas Metropolitano for sponsorship reasons, is a stadium in Madrid, Spain. It has been the home stadium of Atlético Madrid since the 2017–18 season. It is located in the Rosas neighbourhood, in the San Blas-Canillejas district.

The stadium was built as part of Madrid's unsuccessful bid to host the 1997 World Athletics Championships, and was opened on 6 September 1994 by the Community of Madrid. It was closed in 2004 due to the city's unsuccessful bid for the 2016 Olympics and in 2013 it passed into the possession of Atlético Madrid. The stadium was renovated and the new facility was reopened to the public on 16 September 2017, when Atlético Madrid faced Málaga in La Liga. The stadium had a capacity of 20,000 spectators upon its closure and re-opened with a seating capacity of 68,456 after renovation. 

The stadium hosted the 2019 UEFA Champions League Final on 1 June 2019.

Name
The stadium was formerly known as Estadio de la Comunidad de Madrid (Madrid Community Stadium), Estadio Olímpico de Madrid (Madrid Olympic Stadium), and more commonly by its nickname Estadio de La Peineta (The Comb Stadium). Naming rights were acquired by the Wanda Group, a Chinese real estate company. Due to UEFA sponsorship regulations the stadium is known as Estadio Metropolitano in UEFA marketing materials.

History
During the early 1990s the Sports Council of the Community of Madrid promoted the city's bid to host the World Athletics Championships in 1997. The preparations began for a stadium in eastern Madrid, next to the M-40 motorway and close to the Madrid–Barajas Airport. 

Construction of the new stadium began in 1990 and was based on a design proposed by Cruz y Ortiz. It was completed in November 1993 at a cost of €45 million, and the inauguration took place in September 1994 in front of then IOC president Juan Antonio Samaranch, then Community of Madrid president Joaquín Leguina, and then mayor of Madrid José María Álvarez del Manzano. The single seating tier stadium with a capacity of 20,000 seats became known as La Peineta (the comb) because of its similarity with a traditional hair comb.

The 1997 World Championships in Athletics were eventually awarded to Athens in 1995, and La Peineta was used for minor sports and cultural events during the first decade of its existence.

New stadium
In 2004, the stadium was closed for a future project upon the Madrid bid for the 2012 Olympics. The following year, the bid failed. In December 2008, Atlético's president Enrique Cerezo and mayor of Madrid Alberto Ruiz-Gallardón signed an agreement indicating that Atlético Madrid would eventually move to the stadium in the following years and for the renovations to begin. The club was initially supposed to move to the new stadium in 2013, but this was pushed back numerous times due to Olympic bids and the economic crisis.

Following another defeat of Madrid's Olympic bid in 2009, this time for the 2016 Olympics, many proposals were made for the future use of the stadium. In November 2011, the first demolition works were carried out at the stadium. In Spring 2012, more works were carried out, this time with the removal of the lower seating tier and the removal of the athletics track.

Madrid made a bid again for the 2020 Olympics, which failed as well in September 2013. A few days after the 125th IOC Session, on 11 September 2013, Atlético Madrid announced their plans to build a stadium on the location of La Peineta, and ownership was officially transferred to the club.

The new stadium was scheduled to replace Vicente Calderón Stadium as Atletico's home for the 2017–18 season. On 9 December 2016, the club announced that the renovated stadium's official name would be Wanda Metropolitano – Wanda for sponsorship reasons and Metropolitano after the 1923–1966 arena which hosted Atlético's matches before Vicente Calderón. In March 2017, the club officially bought the stadium from the City Council of Madrid for €30.4 million. As of 15 April 2017, around 48,500 season tickets had been reserved by the club fans.

On 17 September 2017, the Estadio Metropolitano's inaugural event was a 2017–18 La Liga match between Atlético Madrid and Málaga CF. King Felipe VI of Spain attended the match. Atlético's Antoine Griezmann would go on to score the first goal at the new stadium, in which the match ended in a 1–0 win for Atlético. On 27 September 2017, the Metropolitano hosted its first European game as Chelsea beat Atlético Madrid 2–1 and became the first English club to defeat them at home in any European club competition, as well as the first visiting team to win at the new stadium.

It accommodates 68,000 spectators, with all spectator seats covered by a new roof including 7,000 VIP, 79 VIP suites known as Neptuno Premium. 4,000 car parking spaces are available: 1,000 inside the stadium and 3,000 outside.

The stadium was also the first 100% LED stadium in the world.

Notable events
La Peineta hosted the second leg of the 1996 Supercopa de España on 28 August, with Atlético beating FC Barcelona 3–1 on the night but losing 6–5 on aggregate.

During the 1997–98 Segunda División season, Madrid-based club Rayo Vallecano played some home matches at La Peineta, due to renovation works on its stadium, the Campo de Fútbol de Vallecas.

On 21–22 September 2002, La Peineta hosted the 9th IAAF World Cup, an international track and field sporting event sponsored by the International Association of Athletics Federations.

On 20 September 2017, shortly after the inauguration of the stadium, it was selected by UEFA to host the final match of the 2018–19 UEFA Champions League. The other selected nominee was the Baku National Stadium in Azerbaijan, which hosted the 2019 UEFA Europa League Final. This was the fifth European Cup/UEFA Champions League final held in Madrid, after the 1957, 1969, 1980, and 2010 finals, all held at the Santiago Bernabéu Stadium of Atlético's cross-town rival Real Madrid.

On 27 March 2018, the stadium hosted the Spain national football team for the first time for a friendly against Argentina, which ended in a 6–1 win for Spain.

On 21 April 2018, it hosted the 2018 Copa del Rey Final between Sevilla and Barcelona. Barcelona won the game with a final score of 5–0. During the game Andrés Iniesta was substituted with a standing ovation by the fans since it was his last final with Barcelona.

On 17 March 2019, Metropolitano hosted the Spanish women's league match between Atlético Madrid and Barcelona, with 60,739 spectators attending the match, thus beating the worldwide record for a women's football match between clubs.

On 1 June 2019, the stadium hosted the 2019 UEFA Champions League Final between Tottenham Hotspur and Liverpool in which Liverpool defeated Spurs 2–0.

On 1 June 2022, the Rolling Stones held a concert there as their first show of their Sixty tour.

Transport and access 

The Madrid City Council, the Spanish Ministry of Public Works and Transport and Atletico Madrid signed an agreement to improve access to the stadium. The first phase of the work was planned to be completed before the stadium opened, and included the new entrance from the M-40 towards Avenida Luis Aragonés, the braiding link between the Eisenhower Knot (M-14 and M-21) and the stadium service road, the improvement of the entrance by Arcentales Avenue, the construction of a second vestibule, and finally access to the Estadio Metropolitano Metro station. These infrastructures will be paid by the club for a fee close to 30 million euros.

The second phase was planned to take place after the inauguration. According to the announcement by the Ministry of Public Works and Transport, it consists of the opening of the O'Donnell Cercanías Madrid station, which will convert the existing stop into a new station for the Rejas neighborhood. The station will be located at the intersection of the M-21 dual carriageway and M-40 highway, close to Ciudad Pegaso and the Plenilunio Shopping Center and near the Wanda Metropolitano.

The City Council is in talks with the Ministry of Public Works and Transport and the Community of Madrid about further improving access to the new stadium and adapting to the substantial increase of traffic to the neighborhood once it is operational. The measures proposed by the municipality of Madrid include a request to extend line 2 of Metro to the future O'Donnell Cercanías Madrid station, as well as the connection of said line to line 7's Estadio Metropolitano Metro station, which has the largest platform in the network.

There are three more Metro stations within a two to 20 minute walk of the stadium: Las Rosas (line 2), Canillejas (line 5), and Las Musas (line 7). The buses of EMT Madrid with a stop close to the stadium are lines 28, 38, 48, 140, 153, E2, N5 and N6 (the last two lines are nocturnal buses). The long-distance buses are lines 286, 288 and 289. The EMT operates a special service on match days; one line runs from the Canillejas exchanger to the stadium (SE721 line). Canillejas has connections to Metro line 5 and EMT bus lines 77, 101, 140, 151 and 200.

Construction gallery

References

External links 

 Gallery in the web of the club (updated)
 Official project video of the stadium
 Estadios de España 
 Non-official website of the expansion works 

Atlético Madrid
Football venues in Madrid
Sports venues completed in 1994
1994 establishments in Spain
Buildings and structures in San Blas-Canillejas District, Madrid